Chris Anderson (February 26, 1926 – February 4, 2008) was an American jazz pianist, who might be best known as an influence on Herbie Hancock.

Biography
Born in Chicago on February 26, 1926, Anderson taught himself piano and started playing in Chicago clubs in the mid-1940s and played with Von Freeman and Charlie Parker, among others.

Despite the respect of his peers, Anderson had difficulty finding work or popular acclaim due in large part to his disabilities. He was blind and his bones were unusually fragile, causing numerous fractures,  which at times compromised his ability to perform at the times or places requested, although he continued to record until he was well into his 70s. A Down Beat profile indicated he had "Osteogenesis", probably meaning osteogenesis imperfecta.

He died of a stroke on February 4, 2008, in Manhattan, New York City, at the age of 81.

Discography

As leader/co-leader

As sideman
With Clifford Jordan
 Remembering Me-Me (Muse, 1977)
 The Mellow Side of Clifford Jordan (Mapleshade, 1997)

With Charlie Parker
 An Evening at Home with the Bird (Savoy, 1961)
 One Night in Chicago (Savoy, 1980)

With others
 Sun Ra, Sun Ra Sextet at the Village Vanguard (Rounder, 1993)
 Frank Strozier, Long Night (Jazzland, 1961)

References

External links
[ All Music]
The New York Times obituary
"Herbie Hancock, Chris Anderson and the Chicago School of Modern Jazz Piano" at Jazz.com.

1926 births
2008 deaths
20th-century American pianists
American jazz pianists
American male pianists
Bienen School of Music alumni
Blind musicians
Musicians from Chicago
Jazz musicians from Illinois
20th-century American male musicians
American male jazz musicians